The Association of Professional Engineers and Geoscientists of Saskatchewan (APEGS) is the regulatory body for professional engineers and geoscientists in the Canadian province of Saskatchewan. It is a member of Engineers Canada. Its authority is granted under the provincial legislation entitled The Engineering and Geoscience Professions Act.

References

External links
 
Engineering societies based in Canada

Professional associations based in Canada
Professional associations based in Saskatchewan